WEYS-LD, VHF digital channel 6 (virtual channel 31), is a low-powered Almavision-owned-and-operated television station licensed to Miami, Florida, United States.

History

As W56AZ
Founded in 1979 by the board of county commissioners, it was a relay translator for PBS affiliate WPBT-TV. The station went temporarily dark in 1989 for repairs and upgrades. It returned soon thereafter, though the format remained the same until the county commissioners sold the station in 2001 to WEYS Television Corp, then an affiliate of Network One.

As WEYS-LP
By 2003, the call sign was changed to WEYS-LP. It was later sold to Cayo Hueso Networks, LLC. The station continued as a relay translator until it was sold once more to Almavision Hispanic Network, Inc. in 2005. With the relay translator station of WSBS-TV discontinued, it ran religious programming full-time, replacing Network One. As a low-power station, it remained as an analog station after the transition. Its audio also could be picked up at 87.7 FM due to an overlap between channel 6 and the start of the FM band. This kind of station is colloquially known as a "Franken-FM."

The station was licensed for digital operation on July 12, 2021, changing its call sign to WEYS-LD. The station's radio programs moved to WNMA in January 2022.

External links

EYS-LD
Television channels and stations established in 2003
2003 establishments in Florida
Low-power television stations in the United States
ATSC 3.0 television stations